Steve Simmons is an American soccer coach who is the Assistant Athletic Director and Director of Soccer with Linfield College in McMinnville, Oregon. Mr. Simmons is also a MLS Professional Match Evaluator since 2011 and a MLS Grassroots Instructor.

Playing career
He played soccer at Chugiak High School. He was inducted into the Alaska High School Hall of Fame in 2014.
He played soccer at Concordia University from 1987 to 1990 under head coach Dan Birkey. He was a first-team NCCAA All-American during his senior season. He was a two-time NAIA Northwest All-Regional Selection. He earned the Concordia's Male Athlete of the Year award in 1990. In 1993, he earned a spot on the school's Athletics Wall of Fame.

Coaching career

Early coaching
He started his coaching career at his alma mater, Concordia University. He worked as an assistant under long-time head coach Dan Birkey from 1990 to 1993, before becoming an assistant at Gonzaga University. He got his first taste of head coaching experience in 1995, when he was named head soccer coach at Division III Whitworth College. In one season there, he compiled a 9-8-2 record and earned Northwest Conference Coach of the Year honors.

From 1996 to 2001, he served as both the men's and women's soccer coach at Division III Linfield College. He led Linfield to a 58-41-3 record over six seasons.   He also coached the Linfield College Women's Lacrosse team from 1997-1999.

Northern Illinois
From 2003 to 2009, he coach the Northern Illinois University men's soccer program. He posted a 59-47-13 mark in six seasons, including 56 from 2004 to 2008. That five-year span set a new school record for victories during that timespan. The Huskies reached double digit wins in four out of his six seasons.

In 2004 and 2006, he won the MAC Coach of the Year award. He coached the 2006 team to a school record 15 wins, and a perfect 9–0 record in home games. In 2007, he led the Huskies to arguably the biggest upset in school history with a 2–1 double overtime win against ninth ranked Northwestern.

In 2008, Northern Illinois went 11-6-4, for a second-place finish in the Mid-American Conference. The Huskies also advanced to the MAC Tournament's championship game, before falling to top ranked Akron.

Oregon State
From 2001 to 2002, he served as the associate head soccer coach at Oregon State University. He was named head men's soccer coach at Oregon State later in 2009.

During his tenure as Head Coach, the Beaver's program produce three MLS First Round Draft Picks; Danny Mwanga No. 1 in 2010, Emery Welshman No. 13 in 2013 and Khiry Shelton No. 2 in 2015.

December 1, 2017 Steve was "let go" by Oregon State University. Steve compiled a record of 62-87-15 in his nine seasons as Head Coach of the Beavers Men's Soccer program.

Linfield College 
In 2018 Steve joined the sporting staff at Linfield College in McMinnville Oregon as the Assistant Athletic Director and Director of Soccer.

References

External links
 Oregon State profile
LinkedIn profile

1967 births
Living people
Association footballers not categorized by position
Gonzaga Bulldogs men's soccer coaches
Northern Illinois Huskies men's soccer coaches
Oregon State Beavers men's soccer coaches
Concordia University (Oregon) alumni
Linfield University people
Sportspeople from Anchorage, Alaska
Soccer players from Alaska
American soccer coaches
Sportspeople from Vancouver, Washington
Soccer players from Washington (state)
Concordia Cavaliers men's soccer players
Concordia Cavaliers men's soccer coaches
Whitworth Pirates men's soccer players
Linfield Wildcats men's soccer coaches
Association football players not categorized by nationality